The 2011 Quebec Scotties Tournament of Hearts was held January 30- February 6, 2011 at the Centre sportif de Buckingham in Buckingham, Quebec.  The winning team of Marie-France Larouche represented team Quebec at the 2011 Scotties Tournament of Hearts in Charlottetown, Prince Edward Island, finishing the round robin with a record 4-7, the first time in four Scotties Larouche did not make the playoffs.

Teams

Standings

Results

Draw 1
January 31, 8:15 AM

Draw 2
January 31, 3:45 PM

Draw 3
February 1, 8:15 AM

Draw 4
February 1, 3:45 PM

Draw 5
February 2, 12:00 PM

Draw 6
February 2, 7:30 PM

Draw 7
February 3, 12:00 PM

Draw 8
February 3, 7:30 PM

Draw 9
February 4, 8:15 AM

Tie Breaker
February 4, 3:45 PM

Playoffs

1 vs. 2
February 5, 2:00 PM

3 vs. 4
February 5, 2:00 PM

Semifinal
February 5, 7:00 PM

Final
February 6, 12:00 PM

References

Quebec Scotties Tournament Of Hearts, 2011
Quebec
Scotties Tournament of Hearts
Quebec Scotties Tournament of Hearts
Quebec Scotties Tournament of Hearts
Curling competitions in Quebec